Matthew Christopher Sobaski (born March 16, 1976) is an American fashion designer mostly known for bridal wear.

Personal life
Christopher was born on March 16, 1976, in Packwood, Iowa, to Kenneth Sobaski, a hog farmer and Sandy Sobaski, a registered nurse. Christopher learned to sew participating in 4-H. He attended the Art Institute of Chicago for one year before completing his studies at Iowa State University. He moved to New York City in 2000 to pursue a career in the field of couture designing, and started his own fashion label in 2002.

In popular culture
Christopher's designs for gowns are featured in movies including The Wedding Ringer with Kaley Cuoco. Christopher's list of clientele includes Kristin Chenoweth, Carli Lloyd, Julie Lake, and Debra Messing. Several of Christopher's couture gowns and wedding dresses were covered in the January 2016 edition of Vanity Fair in a featured article. He makes a cameo in the documentary He Lied About Everything as the custome designer of Benita Alexander's dress. His gowns have also appeared in the Broadway adaptation of Honeymoon in Vegas and on the TV show Say Yes to the Dress.

References

External links

Living people
American fashion designers
LGBT fashion designers
Wedding dress designers
High fashion brands
Luxury brands
1976 births